Hadi Hobeich (born July 1, 1974), is a Lebanese politician, lawmaker and MP of the Akkar district in North Lebanon since 2005. He is part of the March 14 alliance and a member of the Future Movement, presided by Saad Hariri.

Early years
Hadi Hobeich, born in Qobayeit, is one of three children of Cheikh Faouzi Hobeich, former MP and Minister of Culture and Education, and Therese Daher. In high school, he enrolled with the Jesuits, at the college of Rosaries of Louaizeh, Kesrouan. He attended the University of Sagesse where he  graduated from Law School in 1997. He interned at the office of former judge Dr. Mounif Hamdan from 1998 until 2001. He then founded his own law firm and started his political activism. In 2006, he married Cynthia Karkafi, daughter of Bechara Maurice Karkafi. They have four children: Christina, Tiffany, Charbel, Joseph.

Political career
In 2004, he starts his political career during the municipal elections of his hometown Al Qoubaiyat, where he defeated incumbent MP Mikhail Daher. 
In 2005, he was the youngest elected MP in the Parliament of Lebanon at the age of 30, representing the Maronite seat in Akkar. He integrated the parliamentary block of Future Movement and became a member of the Parliamentary Committee on Administration and Justice. 
In 2009 he was re-elected MP for the Akkar district, with 63.1% of the votes at the Lebanese parliamentary elections of 2009 thereby increasing his lead over his closest competitor.
In 2010 and 2016, he leads the re-election of his list at the Al Qoubaiyat municipality council against the Free Patriotic Movement.

Parliamentary work
He is an advocate for increasing the accountability of ministers for their governmental performance. He questioned the Minister of Energy, Alan Tabourian on 19/01/2009, about the long-term rupture of electricity in Akkar as well as the subsequent suspicious rationing in the region, the disappearance of diesel fuel stocks, and the fate of electrical transformers intended for Akkar.
He has also drafted several laws, most notably the regulations submitted on 05/11/2008 to amend some provisions of the law for establishing the Constitutional Council.
On 22/09/2006, he contributed an amount of 3 billion pounds of the allocations of the Ministry of Public work and transport for the rehabilitation and paving of roads and streets in Akkar province.

References

External links
 

1974 births
Living people
Lebanese Maronites
Members of the Parliament of Lebanon
Future Movement politicians
People from Akkar Governorate